Muhammad Tanko (born in 1969) is a Nigerian professor, academic, former vice chancellor of Kaduna State University (KASU). and is the current vice chancellor of Mewar International University Nigeria.

Early life and education 
Muhammad was born in 1969 in the Kawo area of Kaduna state. He was educated at Bayero University Kano where graduated with bachelor of science in accounting in 1991, Master degree in accounting and PhD from Ahmadu Bello University, Zaria.

Career 
Tanko was former deputy vice chancellor of Kaduna State University. In January, 2017 Nasir el-Rufai, Governor of Kaduna State appointed him as vice chancellor.

References 

1960 births
Living people
People from Kaduna State
Ahmadu Bello University alumni
Bayero University Kano alumni